The PMPC Star Award for Best Best Youth-Oriented Program is given to the best television youth-oriented programs of the year from 1997 to 2014.

1997: T.G.I.S. (GMA-7)

1998: T.G.I.S. (GMA-7)

1999: Tabing Ilog (ABS-CBN 2)

2000: Tabing Ilog (ABS-CBN 2)

2001: Tabing Ilog (ABS-CBN 2)

2002: Tabing Ilog (ABS-CBN 2)

2003: Click (GMA 7)

2004: Click (GMA 7)

2005: Love to Love (GMA 7)

2006: Love to Love (GMA 7)

2007: Star Magic Presents: Abt Ur Luv (ABS-CBN 2)

2008: Boys Nxt Door (GMA 7)

2009: Ka-Blog! (GMA 7)

2010: Lipgloss (TV5)

2011: Tween Hearts (GMA 7)

2012: Luv U (ABS-CBN 2)

2013: Luv U (ABS-CBN 2)

2014: Luv U (ABS-CBN 2)

References

Notes

 In 2007, Love to Love (GMA-7) was nominated as "Best Weekly Daytime Drama Series".
 In 2015, Luv U (ABS-CBN 2) was nominated for "Best Comedy Program" instead this category.

PMPC Star Awards for Television